The plum-throated cotinga (Cotinga maynana) is a species of bird in the family Cotingidae. It is found in Bolivia, Brazil, Colombia, Ecuador, and Peru. Its natural habitats are subtropical or tropical moist lowland forest, subtropical or tropical swamps, and heavily degraded former forest.

Taxonomy
In 1760 the French zoologist Mathurin Jacques Brisson included a description of the plum-throated cotinga in his Ornithologie based on a specimen collected in Maynas Province, Peru. He used the French name Le cotinga des Mayas and the Latin Cotinga Maynanensis. Although Brisson coined Latin names, these do not conform to the binomial system and are not recognised by the International Commission on Zoological Nomenclature. When in 1766 the Swedish naturalist Carl Linnaeus updated his Systema Naturae for the twelfth edition, he added 240 species that had been previously described by Brisson. One of these was the plum-throated cotinga. Linnaeus included a brief description, coined the binomial name Ampelis maynana and cited Brisson's work. This species is now placed in the genus Cotinga that was introduced by  Brisson in 1760. The plum-throated cotinga is monotypic.

References

External links
Image at ADW

plum-throated cotinga
Birds of the Amazon Basin
Birds of the Colombian Amazon
Birds of the Ecuadorian Amazon
Birds of the Peruvian Amazon
plum-throated cotinga
plum-throated cotinga
Taxonomy articles created by Polbot